The 2012 Australian Swimming Championships were held from 15 March until 22 March 2012 at the South Australia Aquatic and Leisure Centre in Adelaide, South Australia. They double up as the national trials for the 2012 Summer Olympics.

Qualification criteria

Medal winners

Men's events

Legend:

Women's events

Legend:

References
 Championships results

Australia
Australian championships
Australian Swimming Championships
Sports competitions in Adelaide
Swimming Championships
2010s in Adelaide
March 2012 sports events in Australia